Kaew Fairtex (Thai: แก้ว แฟร์เท็กซ์; born, September 5, 1984) is a Thai kickboxer and the former WBC Muay Thai World champion at super featherweight and current WPMF World champion at super lightweight. He trains out of Fairtex Gym.

As of 1 August 2020, he is ranked the #7 featherweight in the world by Combat Press.

Career
Kaew won K-1 World GP 2014 –65 kg Tournament on November 3, 2014 Shibuya, Tokyo, Japan defeating three Japanese kickboxers in one night with his lightning fast head kicks, and his ability to avoid punches. He took unanimous decision victory over Hideaki Yamazaki in the quarter final, he went through to the finals upsetting one of the best kickboxers in this category, Yuta Kubo, stopping him in the second round with a right hook, finally defeating Yasuomi Soda  and conquering the tournament. Kaew dedicated his win to his father, who died a week before the tournament.

Kaew will defend his K-1 super lightweight championship at the K-1 Japan Bantamweight World GP on April 22 against Yamazaki Hideaki.

Titles

Kickboxing
K-1
2018 K-1 World GP -65kg World Tournament Champion
2016 K-1 World GP -65kg World Tournament Champion
K-1 Super Lightweight Champion (first; 2 defenses)
2014 K-1 World GP -65kg World Tournament Champion
Hero Legend
Hero Legend 2012 Asia 65 kg Tournament winner
Awards
eFight.jp
Fighter of the Month (September 2013)

Muaythai
Lumpinee Stadium
2009 Lumpinee Stadium Lightweight champion (135 lb)
2006 Lumpinee Stadium Featherweight champion (126 lb)
Professional Boxing Association of Thailand
2005 Thailand (PAT) Featherweight champion (126 lb)
WBC Muay Thai
2007 WBC Muay Thai World Super featherweight champion (130 lb)
2006 WBC Muay Thai World Super featherweight champion (130 lb)
WPMF
2014 WPMF World Super Lightweight champion (140 lb)

Fight record

|-  style="background:#FFBBBB;"
| 2019-12-28|| Loss ||align=left| Rukiya Anpo || K-1 World GP 2019 Japan: ～Women's Flyweight Championship Tournament～ || Nagoya, Japan || Ext.R Decision (Unanimous) || 4 || 3:00 
|-
! style=background:white colspan=9 |
|-  style="background:#FFBBBB;"
| 2019-06-30|| Loss ||align=left| Rukiya Anpo ||K-1 World GP 2019: Super Bantamweight World Tournament || Saitama, Japan || Ext.R Decision (Unanimous) || 4 || 3:00 
|-
! style=background:white colspan=9 |
|-  bgcolor="#CCFFCC"
| 2018-11-03 || Win || align=left| Daizo Sasaki || K-1 World GP 2018: 3rd Super Lightweight Championship Tournament, Final || Saitama Prefecture, Japan || Decision (Unanimous) || 3 || 3:00
|-
! style=background:white colspan=9 |
|-  
|-  bgcolor="#CCFFCC"
| 2018-11-03 || Win || align=left| Yasuomi Soda || K-1 World GP 2018: 3rd Super Lightweight Championship Tournament, Semi Finals || Saitama Prefecture, Japan || Ext. R. Decision (Unanimous) || 4 || 3:00
|-  
|-  bgcolor="#CCFFCC"
| 2018-11-03 || Win || align=left| Tetsuya Yamato || K-1 World GP 2018: 3rd Super Lightweight Championship Tournament, Quarter Finals || Saitama Prefecture, Japan || KO (Left High Kick) || 1 || 1:30
|-  
|- bgcolor="#FFBBBB"
| 2018-05-26 || Loss || align=left| Qiu Jianliang || Glory of Heroes 31|| Beijing, China || Decision (Unanimous) || 3 || 3:00
|- 
|- bgcolor="#FFBBBB"
| 2018-03-21 || Loss || align=left| Ren Hiramoto || K-1 World GP 2018: K'FESTA.1 || Saitama, Japan || KO (Punches) || 2 || 2:18
|- 
|-  bgcolor="#CCFFCC"
| 2017-09-09 || Win || align=left| Liu Wei || Hero Legend 2017 || Taian, China || TKO(cut/doctor stops) || 2 || 
|- 
|-  bgcolor="#FFBBBB"
| 2017-06-18 || Loss || align=left| Masaaki Noiri || K-1 World GP 2017 Super Middleweight Championship Tournament || Tokyo, Japan || Ext. R. Decision (Split) || 4 || 3:00
|- 
! style=background:white colspan=9 |
|-  bgcolor="#CCFFCC"
| 2017-04-22 || Win || align=left| Hideaki Yamazaki || K-1 World GP 2017 Super Bantamweight Championship Tournament || Tokyo, Japan || Decision (Unanimous) || 3 || 3:00
|-
! style=background:white colspan=9 |
|-  
|-  bgcolor="#CCFFCC"
| 2017-01-14 || Win || align=left| Wang Pengfei  || Wu Lin Feng 2016 World Kickboxing Championship || Zhengzhou, China || Decision (Unanimous) || 3 || 3:00
|-
|-  style="background:#f7f6a8;"
| 2016-08-20|| Ex. ||align=left| Takeru Segawa || Krush.68|| Tokyo, Japan || Exhibition ||  ||
|-  
|-  bgcolor="#CCFFCC"
| 2016-06-24 || Win || align=left| Ilias Bulaid || K-1 World GP 2016 -65kg World Tournament, Final || Tokyo, Japan || TKO (Knee to the body) || 2 || 2:26
|-
! style=background:white colspan=9 |
|-  
|-  bgcolor="#CCFFCC"
| 2016-06-24 || Win || align=left| Masaaki Noiri || K-1 World GP 2016 -65kg World Tournament, Semi Finals || Tokyo, Japan || Decision (Unanimous) || 3 || 3:00
|-  
|-  bgcolor="#CCFFCC"
| 2016-06-24 || Win || align=left| Hiroya Kawabe || K-1 World GP 2016 -65kg World Tournament, Quarter Finals || Tokyo, Japan || KO (Left hook) || 1 || 0:36
|-  
|-  bgcolor="#CCFFCC"
| 2016-04-24 || Win || align=left| Ilias Bulaid || K-1 World GP 2016 -60kg Japan Tournament || Tokyo, Japan || Decision (unanimous) || 3 || 3:00
|-
|-  bgcolor="#CCFFCC"
| 2016-03-04 || Win || align=left| Massaro Glunder  || K-1 World GP 2016 -65kg Japan Tournament || Tokyo, Japan || Decision (Split) || 3 || 3:00
|-
! style=background:white colspan=9 |
|-
|-  bgcolor="#CCFFCC"
| 2015-11-21 || Win || align=left| Minoru Kimura || K-1 World GP 2015 The Championship || Tokyo, Japan || KO (overhand left & left high knee) || 1 || 2:55
|-
! style=background:white colspan=9 |
|-  
|-  bgcolor="#CCFFCC"
| 2015-07-04 || Win || align=left| Yasuomi Soda || K-1 World GP 2015 -70kg Championship Tournament || Tokyo, Japan || Decision (unanimous) || 3 || 3:00
|-  
|-  bgcolor="#CCFFCC"
| 2015-06-07 || Win || align=left| Zhang Chunyu ||  Kunlun Fight 26 || Chongqing, China || Decision (Unanimous) || 3 || 3:00
|-
|-  bgcolor="#CCFFCC"
| 2015-03-22 || Win || align=left| Kenta Yamada || WPMF JAPAN×REBELS SUK WEERASAKRECK FAIRTEX || Tokyo, Japan || Decision (unanimous) || 5 || 3:00
|-
|-  bgcolor="#FFBBBB"
| 2015-01-18 || Loss || align=left| Minoru Kimura || K-1 World GP 2015 -60kg Championship Tournament || Tokyo, Japan || Decision (Majority) || 3 || 3:00
|- 
|-  bgcolor="#CCFFCC"
| 2014-11-03 || Win || align=left| Yasuomi Soda || K-1 World GP 2014 -65kg Championship Tournament, Final || Tokyo, Japan || Decision (Majority) || 3 || 3:00
|-
! style=background:white colspan=9 |
|-
|-  bgcolor="#CCFFCC"
| 2014-11-03 || Win || align=left| Yuta Kubo || K-1 World GP 2014 -65kg Championship Tournament, Semi Finals || Tokyo, Japan || KO (Right hook) || 2 || 1:52
|-
|-  bgcolor="#CCFFCC"
| 2014-11-03 || Win || align=left| Hideaki Yamazaki || K-1 World GP 2014 -65kg Championship Tournament, Quarter Finals || Tokyo, Japan || Decision (Unanimous) || 3 || 3:00
|-
|-  bgcolor="#CCFFCC"
| 2014-07-12 || Win || align=left| Kosuke Komiyama || RISE 100 -Blade 0- || Tokyo, Japan || Decision (Unanimous) || 3 || 3:00
|-
|-  bgcolor="#CCFFCC"
| 2014-04-06 || Win || align=left| Enkhamar Batbayar || Thai Fight || Sattahip, Thailand || TKO || 2 || 
|-
|-  bgcolor="#CCFFCC"
| 2014-02-11 || Win || align=left| Hiroki Ishii || Rikix "No Kick, No Life 2014" || Tokyo, Japan || KO (Left high kick) || 2 || 0:44
|-
! style=background:white colspan=9 |
|-
|-  bgcolor="#CCFFCC"
| 2014-01-17 || Win || align=left| Victor Nagbe || Muay Thai Warriors in Phuket || Phuket, Thailand || Decision (Unanimous) || 5 || 3:00
|-
|-  bgcolor="#CCFFCC"
| 2013-11-17 || Win || align=left| Julene || M-Fight Suk Weerasakreck IV　Part.1 || Tokyo, Japan || KO (Right hook) || 2 || 1:19
|-
|-  bgcolor="#CCFFCC"
| 2013-09-15 || Win || align=left| Genji Umeno || M-Fight Suk Weerasakreck III Part.2 || Tokyo, Japan || TKO (3 Knock downs) || 2 || 1:14
|-
|-  bgcolor="#CCFFCC"
| 2013-06-16 || Win || align=left| Hideya Tanaka || M-Fight Suk Weerasakreck II Part.2 || Tokyo, Japan || TKO (Left elbow) || 2 || 2:06
|-
|-  bgcolor="#CCFFCC"
| 2013-03-24 || Win || align=left| Daiki Watabe || M-Fight Suk Weerasakreck I Part.2 || Tokyo, Japan || Decision (Unanimous) || 3 || 3:00
|-
|-  bgcolor="#FFBBBB"
| 2013-03-02 || Loss || align=left| Dylan Salvador || Warriors Night 1 || Paris, France || Decision (Unanimous) || 5 || 3:00
|-
|-  bgcolor="#CCFFCC"
| 2012-12-02 || Win || align=left| Satoshi Taniguchi || RISE/M-1MC -Infinity- || Tokyo, Japan || KO (Left high kick) || 1 || 0:12
|-
|-  bgcolor="#CCFFCC"
| 2012-11-11 || Win || align=left| Yusuke Sugawara || M-1 Muay thai Challenge Sutt Yod Muaythai vol.4 Part2 || Tokyo, Japan || KO (Left elbow) || 2 || 0:59
|-
|-  bgcolor="#CCFFCC"
| 2012-09-09 || Win || align=left| Suman "Osamitsu Taka" Ko || M-1 Muay Thai Challenge Sutt Yod Muaythai vol.3 Part2 || Tokyo, Japan || KO (Punches) || 4 || 1:45
|-
|-  bgcolor="#CCFFCC"
| 2012-04-21 || Win || align=left| Yodvisanu Fairtex || Hero Legend 2012 - Asia 65 kg Tournament, Final || Heze, China || KO (Left hook) || 1 || 
|-
! style=background:white colspan=9 |
|-
|-  bgcolor="#CCFFCC"
| 2012-04-21 || Win || align=left| Liu Wei || Hero Legend 2012 - Asia 65 kg Tournament, Semi Finals || Heze, China || KO (Knee to the body) || 3 || 
|-
|-  bgcolor="#CCFFCC"
| 2012-04-21 || Win || align=left| Taito Ike || Hero Legend 2012 - Asia 65 kg Tournament, Quarter Finals || Heze, China || KO (Left hook) || 3 || 1:21
|-
|-  bgcolor="#FFBBBB"
| 2012-03-03 || Loss || align=left| Farmongkon Sor Jor Danyarong || Omnoi Stadium || Bangkok, Thailand || Decision || 5 || 3:00
|-
|-  bgcolor="#CCFFCC"
| 2011-11-05 || Win || align=left| Zhang Bo || Hero Legend 2011 || Changsha, China || Decision || 3 || 3:00
|-
|-  bgcolor="#CCFFCC"
| 2011-08-13 || Win || align=left| Peng Dong || Hero Legend 2011 || Nanchang, China || Decision || 3 || 3:00
|-
|-  bgcolor="#CCFFCC"
| 2011-07-06 || Win || align=left| Ninmongkol Kaennorasing || Fairtex Thepprasit Boxing Stadium ||Pattaya, Thailand || KO (Right hook) || 2 || 
|-
|-  bgcolor="#FFBBBB"
| 2009-12-19 || Loss || align=left| Xu Jifu || Chinese Kung Fu vs Muaythai || Foshan, China || Decision || 5 || 3:00
|-
|-  bgcolor="#FFBBBB"
| 2009-10-02 || Loss || align=left| Superball Lookjaomaesaivary || Lumpinee Stadium || Bangkok, Thailand || Decision || 5 || 3:00
|-
|-  bgcolor="#CCFFCC"
| 2009-09-08 || Win || align=left| Sarawuth Loogbaanyai || Lumpinee Stadium || Bangkok, Thailand || TKO || 3 || 
|-
|-  bgcolor="#FFBBBB"
| 2009-06-21 || Loss || align=left| Jomthong Chuwattana || M-1 Fairtex Muay Thai Challenge 2009 Yod Nak Suu vol.2 || Tokyo, Japan || Decision (Majority) || 5 || 3:00
|-
|-  bgcolor="#FFBBBB"
| 2009-04-25 || Loss || align=left| Singdam Kiatmoo9 || Lumpinee Stadium || Bangkok, Thailand || Decision || 5 || 3:00
|-
|-  bgcolor="#CCFFCC"
| 2009-03-21 || Win || align=left| Duangsompong Kor. Sapaotong || Lumpinee Stadium || Bangkok, Thailand || Decision || 5 || 3:00
|-
! style=background:white colspan=9 |
|-  bgcolor="#FFBBBB"
| 2008-12-13 || Loss || align=left| Singdam Kiatmoo9 || Lumpinee Stadium || Bangkok, Thailand || Decision || 5 || 3:00
|-
|-  bgcolor="#CCFFCC"
| 2008-11-01 || Win ||align=left| Lerdsila Chumpairtour || Muaythai Lumpinee Krikkrai, Lumpinee Stadium || Thailand || Decision || 5 || 3:00
|-
|-  bgcolor="#CCFFCC"
| 2008-09-26 || Win ||align=left| Lerdsila Chumpairtour || Wanboonya, Lumpinee Stadium || Bangkok, Thailand || Decision || 5 || 3:00
|-
|-  bgcolor="#FFBBBB"
| 2008-08-05 || Loss ||align=left| Longhern Por Muangthungsong  || Lumpinee Stadium || Bangkok, Thailand || Decision || 5 || 3:00
|-  bgcolor="#CCFFCC"
| 2008-04-01 || Win || align=left| Manjanoi Kiatnapachai || Phetpiya, Lumpinee Stadium || Bangkok, Thailand || Decision || 5 || 3:00
|-
|-  bgcolor="#CCFFCC"
| 2008-03-11 || Win || align=left| Pansak Look Bor Kor || Lumpinee Stadium || Bangkok, Thailand || TKO || 2 || 
|-
|-  bgcolor="#CCFFCC"
| 2008-02-12 || Win || align=left| Supachaileg Sitkomsorn || Lumpinee Stadium || Bangkok, Thailand || Decision || 5 || 3:00
|-
|-  bgcolor="#fbb"
| 2007-11-12 || Loss|| align=left| Chalermdet infinity || Kai Yang Har Dao Tournament || Thailand || Decision || 5 || 3:00
|-  bgcolor="#CCFFCC"
| 2007-09-08 || Win || align=left| Genki Yamamoto || World Championship Muaythai || California, USA || Decision (Unanimous) || 5 || 3:00
|-
! style=background:white colspan=9 |
|-  bgcolor="#FFBBBB"
| 2007-03-02 || Loss|| align=left| Santipap Sitauaubon || Lumpinee champions Krikkrai, Lumpinee Stadium || Bangkok, Thailand || Decision || 5 || 3:00
|-
! style=background:white colspan=9 |
|-  bgcolor="#CCFFCC"
| 2006-12-08 || Win || align=left| Sarawut Lookbanyai || 50 years Lumpinee Krikkrai Fights, Lumpinee Stadium || Bangkok, Thailand || Decision || 5 || 3:00
|-
! style=background:white colspan=9 |
|-  bgcolor="#CCFFCC"
| 2006-09-01|| Win || align=left| Petchmankong Sit Or. || Por.Pramuk, Lumpinee Stadium || Bangkok, Thailand || TKO || 3 || 
|-
|-  bgcolor="#FFBBBB"
| 2006-08-08 || Loss ||align=left| Orono Wor Petchpun || Fairtex, Lumpinee Stadium || Bangkok, Thailand || Decision || 5 || 3:00
|-
|-  bgcolor="#CCFFCC"
| 2006-06-06|| Win || align=left| Traijak Sitjomtrai || Paianun, Lumpinee Stadium || Bangkok, Thailand || Decision || 5 || 3:00
|-
! style=background:white colspan=9 |
|-
|-  bgcolor="#CCFFCC"
| 2006-05-13 || Win || align=left|  Tomasz Makowski ||  Best Of The Best II	 ||  || || 5 ||
|-  bgcolor="#CCFFCC"
| 2006-03-31 || Win || align=left| Yodwanlop Por Nattachai || Lumpinee Stadium || Bangkok, Thailand || Decision || 5 ||
|-  bgcolor="#CCFFCC"
| 2006-01-28 || Win || align=left| In-Wook Bin || Noche de Campeones || Cancun, Mexico || TKO (Referee stoppage) || 4 || 
|-
! style=background:white colspan=9 |
|-  bgcolor="#FFBBBB"
| 2005-12-20 || Loss ||align=left| Yodwanlop P.Nuttachai || Wanboonya, Lumpinee Stadium || Bangkok, Thailand || Decision (Unanimous) || 5 || 3:00
|-
|-  bgcolor="#CCFFCC"
| 2005-11-25|| Win || align=left| Kaonar T.Phonchai || Petchyindee, Lumpinee Stadium || Bangkok, Thailand || TKO || 2 || 
|-  bgcolor="#FFBBBB"
| 2005-10-18 || Loss ||align=left| Traijak Sitjomtrai || Lumpinee Stadium || Bangkok, Thailand || TKO || 2 ||
|-
|-  bgcolor="#FFBBBB"
| 2005-09-27 || Loss ||align=left| Singdam Kiatmuu9 || Lumpinee Stadium || Bangkok, Thailand || Decision || 5 || 3:00
|-  bgcolor="#CCFFCC"
| 2005-07-24 || Win || align=left| Genki Yamamoto || AJKF "Super Fight" || Tokyo, Japan || Decision (Unanimous) || 5 || 3:00
|-
|-  bgcolor="#CCFFCC"
| 2005-07-01 || Win || align=left| Yuttajak Tungsongtaksin || Wanboonya, Lumpinee Stadium || Bangkok, Thailand || TKO || 2 || 
|-
! style=background:white colspan=9 |
|-
|-  bgcolor="#CCFFCC"
| 2005-04-05|| Win || align=left| Phutawan Burirumpukaofire || Fairtex, Lumpinee Stadium || Bangkok, Thailand || TKO || 4 || 
|-
|-  bgcolor="#CCFFCC"
| 2005-03-31|| Win || align=left| Yodwanlop P.Nuttachai || Phetyindee, Lumpinee Stadium || Bangkok, Thailand || Decision || 5 || 3:00
|-
|-  bgcolor="#FFBBBB"
| 2004-12-07 || Loss ||align=left| Phetmanee Phetsupapan || Celebrate Lumpinee Stadium's 48th birthday, Lumpinee Stadium || Bangkok, Thailand || Decision (Unanimous) || 5 || 3:00
|-  bgcolor="#CCFFCC"
| 2004-11-12 || Win ||align=left| Traijak Sitjomtrai || Fairtex, Lumpinee Stadium || Bangkok, Thailand || TKO || 4 || 
|-  bgcolor="#FFBBBB"
| 2004-09-14 || Loss ||align=left| Doungsompong P.Khumpai || Petchpiya, Lumpinee Stadium || Bangkok, Thailand || Decision (Unanimous) || 5 || 3:00
|-  bgcolor="#CCFFCC"
| 2004-07-16 || Win ||align=left| Sarawut Lukbanyai || Wanboonya, Lumpinee Stadium || Bangkok, Thailand || Decision (Unanimous) || 5 || 3:00
|-  bgcolor="#CCFFCC"
| 2004-06-22 || Win ||align=left| AAA T.Rattanakiat || Fairtex, Lumpinee Stadium || Bangkok, Thailand || Decision  || 5 || 3:00
|-  bgcolor="#CCFFCC"
| 2004-05-14 || Win ||align=left| Chalermkiat Kiatphakin || Fairtex, Lumpinee Stadium || Bangkok, Thailand || Decision (Unanimous) || 5 || 3:00
|-  bgcolor="#FFBBBB"
| 2004-03-30 || Loss ||align=left| Wutichai Sor Yupinda ||   Lumpinee Stadium || Bangkok, Thailand || Decision (Unanimous) || 5 || 3:00 
|-  bgcolor="#FFBBBB"
| 2004-01-20 || Loss ||align=left| Ritthideat Sitmoseng ||  Fairtex, Lumpinee Stadium || Bangkok, Thailand || Decision  || 5 || 3:00 
|-  bgcolor="#FFBBBB"
| 2003-12-20 || Loss ||align=left| Lermtong 13Reanresort ||  Krikkrai, Lumpinee Stadium || Bangkok, Thailand || Decision  || 5 || 3:00
|-  bgcolor="#FFBBBB"
| 2003-11-14 || Loss ||align=left| Wuttidet Lukprabat ||  World Boxing WBC, Lumpinee Stadium || Bangkok, Thailand || Decision  || 5 || 3:00
|-  bgcolor="#CCFFCC"
| 2003-10-24 || Win ||align=left| Metee K.Champfarm || Fairtex, Lumpinee Stadium || Bangkok, Thailand || Decision  || 5 || 3:00
|-  bgcolor="#CCFFCC"
| 2003-09-19 || Win ||align=left| Pinsiam Sor.Amnuaysirichoke || Petchpiya, Lumpinee Stadium || Bangkok, Thailand || Decision  || 5 || 3:00
|-  bgcolor="#FFBBBB"
| 2003-08-16 || Loss ||align=left| Yodsaenklai Fairtex || Krikkai, Lumpinee Stadium || Bangkok, Thailand || Decision  || 5 || 3:00
|-  bgcolor="#CCFFCC"
| 2003-07-05 || Win ||align=left| Wanmeechai Menayotin ||  Kirkkai, Lumpinee Stadium || Bangkok, Thailand || Decision  || 5 || 3:00
|-  bgcolor="#CCFFCC"
| 2003-06-07 || Win ||align=left| Yodradub Keatparathai || Muaythai Lumpinee Kirkkai, Lumpinee Stadium || Bangkok, Thailand || Decision  || 5 || 3:00
|-  bgcolor="#c5d2ea"
| 2003-04-08 || Draw||align=left| Phutawan buriramPhukaefai||  Lumpinee Stadium || Bangkok, Thailand || Decision  || 5 || 3:00
|-  bgcolor="#CCFFCC"
| 2003-02-18 || Win ||align=left| Kangwanlek Petchyindee || || Bangkok, Thailand || Decision  || 5 || 3:00
|-  bgcolor="#fbb"
| 2003-01-07 || Loss||align=left| Nopparat Keatkhamtorn ||  Lumpinee Stadium || Bangkok, Thailand || Decision  || 5 || 3:00
|-  style="background:#cfc;"
| 2002-11-12 || Win ||align=left| Rittidet Maimuangkon ||Lumpinee Stadium || Bangkok, Thailand || Decision || 5 || 3:00 
|-  bgcolor="#CCFFCC"
| 2002-09-28 || Win ||align=left| Kangwanlek Petchyindee ||Lumpinee Stadium || Bangkok, Thailand || Decision  || 5 || 3:00
|-  bgcolor="#c5d2ea"
| 2001-09-07 || Draw||align=left| Phet-Ek Kiatyongyut ||Lumpinee Stadium || Bangkok, Thailand || Decision  || 5 || 3:00
|-  style="background:#cfc;"
| 2001-05-25 || Win ||align=left| Banchachai Lukbanyai ||Lumpinee Stadium || Bangkok, Thailand || KO || 2 || 
|-
| colspan=9 | Legend:

See also
List of male kickboxers

References

External links
Kaew Fairtex K-1 profile
Kaew Fairtex's Fight Record in Japan
Interview of KAEW FAIRTEX by Serge TREFEU (2009)
Kaew Fairtex – Fighter of the Month

1985 births
Living people
Lightweight kickboxers
Kaew Fairtex
Kaew Fairtex
Kunlun Fight kickboxers